The 2017 North Alabama Lions football team represented the University of North Alabama during the 2017 NCAA Division II football season. They were led by first-yer head coach Chris Willis. The Lions played their home games at Braly Municipal Stadium and were members of the Gulf South Conference. They finished the season 5–5, 5–3 in GSC play to finish in a five-way tie for second place.

This was their final season as a member of the GSC and NCAA Division II as they will begin a transition to NCAA Division I and the Football Championship Subdivision where they will be a member of the Big South Conference in 2019 after playing 2018 as an FCS independent.

Schedule
North Alabama announced its 2017 football schedule on April 12, 2017. The schedule consists of five home and away games in the regular season. The Lions will host GSC foes Delta State, Florida Tech, Mississippi College, and West Alabama, and will travel to Shorter, Valdosta State, West Florida, and West Georgia.

The Lions will host one of the two non-conference games against Texas A&M–Commerce from the Lone Star Conference and travel to Central Washington from the Great Northwest Athletic Conference.

Rankings

References

North Alabama
North Alabama Lions football seasons
North Alabama Lions football